The Gulf of Varna (Varnenski zaliv) is a gulf on the Bulgarian Black Sea coast. The Port of Varna and the major city of Varna are located on the gulf.

References 

 Географический энциклопедический словарь. Москва. «Советская энциклопедия». 1989. стор. 94 

Gulfs of the Black Sea
Bays of Bulgaria
Landforms of Varna Province
Varna, Bulgaria